The Słuszków Hoard is a treasure hoard that was found in the village of Słuszków located in the historical area known as Kalisz Land presently situated in the Greater Poland Voivodeship. The treasure was buried around the year 1100 and was uncovered in 1935. Since 1958, it has been a part of the collection of Kalisz Land Regional Museum. The hoard includes the largest collection of medieval silver coins in Poland as well as the largest collection, in the world, of the so-called "cross denarii" or "cross pennies" (known in German as Radenpfennig).

The hoard contains 13,061 items. Among them are 12,500 cross denarii, early medieval silver ornaments, Polish and foreign coins, silver scrap as well as a rare collection of denarii minted by Palatine Sieciech.

In november 2020 another hoard of 6500 cross denarii and 4 golden rings was found at nearly the same spot as the first hoard.

References 

1935 in Poland
14th century in Europe
Treasure troves of Medieval Europe
Treasure troves of Poland
Kalisz County